This is a list of Hijri years ( or AH) with the corresponding common era years where applicable. For Hijri years since 1297 AH (1879/1881 CE), the  Gregorian date of 1 Muharram, the first day of the year in the  Islamic calendar, is given.

The first Hijri year (AH 1) was retrospectively considered to have begun on the Julian calendar date 15 July 622 (known as the ‘astronomical’ or ‘Thursday’ epoch, Julian day 1,948,439) or 16 July 622 (the ‘civil’ or ‘Friday’ epoch, Julian day 1,948,440), denoted as "1 Muharram, AH  1". Years prior to this are reckoned in English as BH ("Before the Hijra").

In principle, each Islamic month begins with sighting of the new crescent moon (after a New Moon) at sunset. Because of this, the calendar is dependent on observational conditions and cannot be predicted or reconstructed with certainty, but tabular calendars are in use which determine the dates algorithmically. Because of this, dates may vary by up to two days between traditions or countries.

Medieval
c. 53 BH (c. 570 CE) Birth of Muhammad

Early Muslim conquests

AH 1 (15/16 Jul 622 – 3/4 Jul 623)
: death of Muhammad; Muslim conquest of the Levant (AH1218),
: Muslim conquest of Egypt (AH1921),
,, 
,
: AH 61: martyrdom of Husayn ibn Ali,

Islamic Golden Age

,
, ;

Ilkhanate

, ;
;

Early Modern

Muslim Empires 

,
,
,
,
: declaration of the Gregorian calendar
,
,
,
,
,
,
,
,
,
,
,
,
,
,
,
,
,
,
,
,
,
,
,
,
,
,
,
, 3/4 Oct 1853– 23/24 Sep 1854.

Modern

1297 AH to 1399 AH (1879 to 1978 CE)

1400 AH to 1499 AH (1979 to 2075 CE)

See also 
 Islamic calendar
 Hijri year
 Tabular Islamic calendar
 Solar Hijri calendar
 Rumi calendar

References

Citations

Bibliography
 Caetani, Leone, Chronographia Islamica, ossia riassunto cronologico della storia di tutti i popoli musulmani dall’anno 1 all’anno 922 della Higrah (622–1517 dell’Èra Volgare), corredato della bibliografia di tutte le principali fonti stampate e manoscritte,  (Paris: Librairie Paul Geuthner, [1912/22])[only 5 fascicles, covering the period 1 to 132 AH (622/23 to 749/50 CE), were published].

External links
   "Muharram new year", TimeandDate.com, 2012, web:  TD.
   "Crescent Moon Visibility and the Islamic Calendar",  U.S. Navy, usno.navy.mil, webpage:    USNO-cres.
 Robert Harry van Gent, Islamic-Western Calendar Converter (Based on the Arithmetical or Tabular Calendar)
  Islamic Date Converter

Islamic